Pleißenaue is a Verwaltungsgemeinschaft ("collective municipality") in the district Altenburger Land, in Thuringia, Germany. The seat of the Verwaltungsgemeinschaft is in Treben.

The Verwaltungsgemeinschaft Pleißenaue consists of the following municipalities:

Fockendorf 
Gerstenberg 
Haselbach 
Treben
Windischleuba

References

Verwaltungsgemeinschaften in Thuringia